Brigadier general Mohammad Jamali-Paqaleh (1963–2013) was an Iranian commander in the Revolutionary Guards who died in Syrian civil war.

Biography 
Jamali-Paqaleh was born in 1963 in Paqaleh in Shahr-e Babak County, Kerman Province. When he was two years old, his father died. He completed primary school in the village and then migrated to Rafsanjan to continue his education.

Iran–Iraq War 
Jamali-Paqaleh was a veteran of the Iran–Iraq War and was a member of the Sarallah division, the same division outfitted that had trained by General Qassem Soleimani. He had participated in several operations such as Operation Tariq al-Qods, Fath ol-Mobin, Beit ol-Moqaddas, Ramadan, Dawn 8, and Karbala-5,4,1.

Syrian Civil War 
The Iranian news outlet Mehr News Agency reported that Jamali voluntary went to Syria to protect the Sayyidah Zaynab Mosque and another holy shrine against Assad-opposing forces in the Syrian civil war.

Jamali-Paqaleh was reported to have been killed by Syrian rebels either in the final days of October or early November 2013. He was buried on 5 November in Kerman with full military honors.

See also 
 Hossein Hamadani
 Mohsen Ghitaslou
 Ali Reza Tavassoli

References 

1963 births
2013 deaths
People from Kerman Province
Military personnel killed in the Syrian civil war
Islamic Revolutionary Guard Corps personnel of the Syrian civil war
Islamic Revolutionary Guard Corps brigadier generals
Quds Force personnel